The Welsh Ladies Baseball Union (WLBU) is the governing body of the traditional code of women's British baseball in Wales. It was formed in 2006 when the WLBU decided to break away from the men's WBU (formed 1892).

The WLBU headquarters are at the Grangetown Catholic Club, Grangetown, Cardiff.

See also
 Welsh Baseball Union

References

Baseball
Women's sport in Wales
British baseball in the United Kingdom
Governing bodies of British baseball
Organisations based in Cardiff
2006 establishments in Wales
Sports organizations established in 2006